Spark Social or Spark was a matchmaking mobile app from DABSquared released in March 2015. Using geolocation technology and an Internet connection, the app displayed other people using it within a wide radius. The app was also able to use Bluetooth to find people in close proximity, up to 30 metres away, even when no Internet connection was available.

Features
Users could use the app to connect for free with one other person once per day. The other person had 24 hours within which to respond. If the recipient was within close proximity then they would only be notified once they have moved away.

Spark required a Facebook account and included in-app purchases.

References

External links
 
DABSquared

Geosocial networking
Mobile social software
Online dating services of the United Kingdom
2015 software
Computer-related introductions in 2015